Taranath Ranabhat is a Nepalese politician. He was elected to the Pratinidhi Sabha in the 1999 election on behalf of the Nepali Congress. Ranabhat served as its chairman from the same year. He also served as the Speaker of the House of Representatives of Nepal from August 1999 to May 2002.

References

Year of birth missing (living people)
Living people
Speakers of the House of Representatives (Nepal)
Nepali Congress politicians from Gandaki Province
Nepal MPs 1991–1994
Nepal MPs 1999–2002